The Women's junior time trial of the 2013 UCI Road World Championships is a cycling event that took place on 23 September 2013 in the region of Tuscany, Italy.

The course of the race was 16.27 km from the Cascine to the Nelson Mandela Forum in Florence.

Qualification
All National Federations could enter 4 riders of whom 2 could start. Besides of that, the below listed continental champions could take part in addition to this number.

Participating nations
30 nations participated in the women's junior time trial.

  Argentina
  Australia
  Austria
  Belgium
  Belarus
  Canada
  Colombia
  Czech Republic
  Denmark
  Spain
  France
  Germany
  Hong Kong
  Israel
  Italy
  Jordan
  Japan
  Lithuania
  Mexico
  Netherlands
  Norway
  New Zealand
  Poland
  South Africa
  Russia
  Slovakia
  Sweden
  Thailand
  Ukraine
  United States

Schedule

Source

Final classification

DNS = Did not start

See also

 2005 UCI Juniors Road World Championships – Women's time trial

References

Women's junior time trial
UCI Road World Championships – Women's junior time trial
2013 in women's road cycling